David Brits (born ) is a South African rugby union player for the . His regular position is centre.

Brits was named in the  squad for the 2021 Currie Cup Premier Division.

References

South African rugby union players
Living people
1997 births
Rugby union centres
Free State Cheetahs players
Western Province (rugby union) players
Cheetahs (rugby union) players
Rugby union players from the Eastern Cape